Karingachira St. George's Jacobite Syrian Church of Jacobite Syrian Christian Church, established in 722 AD (Makaram 13), is one of the ancient churches of the Syriac Orthodox Church. St. Thomas, one of the twelve apostles of Jesus Christ is the founder of the ancient church in India. Christian writers and historians from the 4th century refer to the evangelistic work of Apostle Thomas in India, and the Indian Christians ascribe the origin of their church to the labours of the apostle in the 1st century.

The church is located near Hill Palace, Thripunitura, Kochi. The church is named after Saint George. The Katthanar (Vicar) of Karingachira was considered the representative of the Nasarani community of the erstwhile Cochin State. During athachamayam, the Katthanar representing the Nasranis, along with Nettur Thangal (representing the Muslims), and Chembil Valia Arayan (representing the fisher folk) accompanied the Maharaja of Cochin State.

Ceremonies 
The Saint Parumala Thirumeni was ordained as a deacon in this church in 1857.
Ignatius Abded Aloho II Patriarch of Antioch held meeting at Karingachira church in July 1911
Ignatius Elias III Patriarch Presided meeting of Mor Gregorios Jacobite Students' Movement and other occasions held at on church
Mor Osthatheos Sleebo and other delegates of Antioch visited this church in Several times
Malankara Association of Jacobite Syrian Christian Church held on this church at 1935
This church was elevated as a cathedral by Patriarch Ignatius Zakka I Iwas in 2004.

Notable visitors 
Ignatius Peter IV Patriarch of Antioch
Geevarghese Gregorios of Parumala
Ignatius Elias III Patriarch of Antioch
Osthatheos Sleebo, Delegate of Antioch
Athanasius Paulose of Aluva
Anthrayose of Kallada
Ivanios Hidayathulla
Gregorius Yuhanon
Baselios Sakralla III of Aleppo
Ignatius Abded Aloho II

References

External links
 St. George Jacobite Syrian Cathedral, Karingachira - Official Website

Churches in Kochi
Syriac Orthodox churches in India
8th-century churches